Metarhizium majus is the name given to a group of fungal isolates that are known to be virulent against Scarabaeidae, a family of beetles.  Previously, this species has had variety status in Metarhizium anisopliae (var. majus) and its name is derived from characteristically very large spores (typically 2.5–4 µm x 10–14 µm long) for the genus Metarhizium.  There has been considerable interest in developing isolates of this species into mycoinsecticides: especially against the coconut and oil palm beetle pest Oryctes in SE Asia, the Pacific region and Africa.

It is an anamorph, its telomorphic form is Cordyceps brittlebankisoides.

Important isolates 
 The epitype is isolate ARSEF 1914: derived from a dried US National Fungus Collection culture (BPI 878297)[1].

References

External links

Clavicipitaceae
Parasitic fungi
Fungi described in 1915
Biopesticides